Marc Henry Leonard (born 19 December 2001) is a Scottish professional footballer who plays as a midfielder for Northampton Town on loan from Premier League club Brighton & Hove Albion and the Scotland under-21 national team.

Club career
In 2018, Leonard, a former Rangers youth player joined the academy of Brighton & Hove Albion from Heart of Midlothian.

Leonard made his professional debut on 24 August 2021, starting in the  2–0 away victory over Cardiff City coming in the EFL Cup second round. He was named in a Premier League matchday squad for the first time in a 1–0 home loss against Wolverhampton Wanderers on 15 December.

On 25 July 2022, Leonard signed for EFL League Two club Northampton Town on loan for the duration of the 2022–23 season. He scored his first professional goal on 25 October, with a precise finish from the edge of the box, scoring the opening goal of the game in an eventual 2–2 draw at home against Sutton United.

International career
After representing Scotland at under-17, 18 and 19 level he made his Scotland U21 debut on 7 October 2021, coming on as a 72nd minute substitute in the 1–0 home loss against Denmark U21 in the 2023 European qualifiers.

Career statistics

References

External links
Profile at the Brighton & Hove Albion F.C. website
Profile at the Scottish FA website

2001 births
Living people
Footballers from Glasgow
Scottish footballers
Association football midfielders
Brighton & Hove Albion F.C. players
Northampton Town F.C. players
English Football League players
Scotland youth international footballers
Scotland under-21 international footballers